Nimo Gribenco (born 23 January 1997) is a Danish professional footballer who plays as a winger.

Career
Gribenco played for Hasle BK, Fuglebakken KFUM and Skovbakken as a youth player, before joining AGF as a U-14 player. He was promoted to the first team squad in 2017.

On 23 February 2019, Gribenco was loaned out to Icelandic club Stjarnan for the rest of 2019. Returning to AGF, Gribenco's contract with terminated by mutual agreement on 29 January 2020.

References

1997 births
Living people
Danish men's footballers
Danish expatriate men's footballers
Fuglebakken KFUM players
Aarhus Gymnastikforening players
Stjarnan players
Danish Superliga players
Association football midfielders
Danish expatriate sportspeople in Iceland
Expatriate footballers in Iceland
VSK Aarhus players